Kiran Walia  is an Indian politician and was member of the Second, Third and Fourth Legislative Assemblies of Delhi,
India. She represented the Malviya Nagar constituency of Delhi and is a member of the Indian National Congress.

Early life and education
Kiran Wali was born in New Delhi. She holds Master of Arts degree in Political Science from Delhi University. Before being elected as MLA, she used to work as a Professor in Delhi University.

Political career
Kiran Walia has been a MLA for three terms. During her recent term, she represented the Malviya Nagar (Delhi Assembly constituency) constituency. She was also a State Minister in Sheila Dikshit's government.

Posts Held

See also

 First Legislative Assembly of Delhi
 Second Legislative Assembly of Delhi
 Third Legislative Assembly of Delhi
 Fourth Legislative Assembly of Delhi
 Fifth Legislative Assembly of Delhi
 Sixth Legislative Assembly of Delhi
Delhi Legislative Assembly
Government of India
Politics of India
Indian National Congress

References 

Women members of the Delhi Legislative Assembly
Living people
1968 births
Indian National Congress (Organisation) politicians
People from New Delhi
Indian National Congress politicians from Delhi
21st-century Indian women politicians
21st-century Indian politicians
Delhi MLAs 1998–2003
Delhi MLAs 2003–2008
Delhi MLAs 2008–2013
Delhi University alumni
Academic staff of Delhi University
Ahluwalia